Pascal Vincent (born September 22, 1971) is a Canadian  former ice hockey player and current associate coach of the Columbus Blue Jackets. Vincent was previously the head coach of the Manitoba Moose of the American Hockey League (2016–2021) and an assistant coach for the Winnipeg Jets (2011–2016).  Vincent was the Quebec Major Junior Hockey League's Coach of the Year for 2007–08, General Manager of the Year for 2006–07, and the American Hockey League's most outstanding coach award in 2017–18.

Hockey career

Player
Vincent made his QMJHL debut as a centre in the 1988–89 season with the St. Jean Castors. Vincent played three more seasons in the QMJHL between St. Jean, Laval, and Verdun before completing his junior career in 1992.

Coach, general manager
Vincent began his coaching career as an assistant coach of the St. Jean Lynx of the QMJHL, and then as the head coach of Laval-Laurentides-Lanaudiere (LLL) Regents of the Quebec AAA Midget Hockey League. Vincent joined the Screaming Eagles as an assistant coach for the 1999–2000 QMJHL season before becoming the head coach in October. Vincent became the team's general manager two years later.

On May 18, 2007, Vincent signed a two-year contract extension with the Screaming Eagles to continue as head coach and general manager. He was the recipient of the 2007 Maurice Filion Trophy for the QMJHL's top general manager, and the 2008 Ron Lapointe Trophy for the QMJHL's top coach. After the 2007–08 season, Vincent was praised by many around the league for the Screaming Eagles finishing fourth in their division and winning their first round playoff series despite having more than ten rookies in their regular lineup and having a sixteen-year-old starting goaltender. On January 1, 2008, Vincent earned his 300th career win in the QMJHL.

On July 22, 2011, Vincent was named an assistant coach of the Winnipeg Jets of the National Hockey League.  After five years in that role, the Jets promoted him to head coach of their AHL team, the Manitoba Moose in 2016. After the 2017–18 season, he won the most outstanding coach award. Vincent stepped down from his position with the Moose to join the Columbus Blue Jackets coaching staff on June 24, 2021.

Career statistics

References

External links

1971 births
Living people
Canadian ice hockey centres
Canadian ice hockey coaches
Cape Breton Screaming Eagles coaches
Ice hockey people from Quebec
Manitoba Moose coaches
Montreal Junior Hockey Club coaches
Sportspeople from Laval, Quebec
Winnipeg Jets coaches